Have Mercy on Us All (lit. "Leave quickly and come back late") is a 2001 novel by French author Fred Vargas. The novel was her first to be translated into English in 2003 by David Bellos. It was made into a film released in 2007.

Plot
Joss, a middle-aged former Breton sailor, begins to succeed in reviving the old family trade of town crier in modern-day Paris. Business is good, since people gladly pay five francs to hear their rants and nonsensical messages in parks and squares; every so often, ominous cryptic messages announcing the return of the plague will also be part of the day's requested cries.

At the same time, chief inspector Adamsberg is surprised as a distressed woman describes that all her apartment building's doors, except one, have been marked with a large inverted "4" in black ink with the inscription "CLT." This graffiti continues to turn up throughout the city, and residents of apartments with unmarked doors are turning up dead, showing signs of rat-flea bites and blackened flesh.

Inspector Adamsberg must lead an investigation that takes him through a juxtaposition of 15th-century Europe and modern-day France...or does he?

2001 French novels
Novels by Fred Vargas
French mystery novels
French novels adapted into films
Novels set in Paris